Las bravías (The Pigeons) is a zarzuela in one act and four scenes with music by Ruperto Chapí. The work uses a Spanish language libretto by Carlos Fernández Shaw and José López Silva that is based on Shakespeare's The Taming of the Shrew. The opera premiered on 12 December 1896 at the Teatro Apolo in Madrid. Excerpts from the opera were recorded by tenor José Carreras, conductor Enrique García Asensio, and the English Chamber Orchestra in 1975 for Brilliant Classics.

Roles

References

Operas
1896 operas
Spanish-language operas
Operas based on The Taming of the Shrew
Zarzuelas by Ruperto Chapí